Ricardo María Carles Gordó (24 September 1926 – 17 December 2013) was a cardinal priest and Archbishop Emeritus of Barcelona in the Catholic Church.

Biography
Born in Valencia, Spain, Carles Gordó was ordained a priest on 29 June 1951.

He studied at Teresian school in Valencia; then, he completed his secondary education at the Jesuit Colegio de San José. He entered the Seminary of Valencia, where he was a pupil at Colegio "Corpus Christi" and finally, he studied at the Pontifical University of Salamanca, where he obtained a licenciate in canon law in 1951–1953.

After his studies he served in pastoral ministry in the archdiocese of Valencia, including parish priest, rector of the parish of San Fernando in Valencia (1967); counselor of the Juventud Obrera Católica, JOC (Catholic Youth Workers); director of the boarding-school for deacons; vicar for clergy; and diocesan counselor for the pastoral for the family.

In 1969 he was appointed Bishop of Tortosa, and later as archbishop of Barcelona in 1990, a post he held until stepping down in 2004. He was made a cardinal by Pope John Paul II in the consistory of 26 November 1994 and held the title of Cardinal-Priest of Santa Maria Consolatrice al Tiburtino. He was one of the cardinal electors who participated in the 2005 papal conclave that selected Pope Benedict XVI.

He died on 17 December 2013.

References

External links
Biography at catholic-pages.org

1926 births
2013 deaths
20th-century Spanish cardinals
21st-century Spanish cardinals
Archbishops of Barcelona
Cardinals created by Pope John Paul II
Pontifical University of Salamanca alumni